Jean Denis Attiret (31 July 1702 – 8 December 1768) was a French Jesuit painter and missionary to Qing China.

Early life 
Attiret was born in Dole, France. He studied art in Rome and made himself a name as a portrait painter. While a Jesuit novice, he did paintings in the Cathedral of Avignon and the Sodality Chapel.

He went to China in 1737 and was given the title Painter to the Emperor by the Qianlong Emperor. Because the emperor insisted on the use of Chinese painting methods and styles, Attiret's painting eventually became entirely Chinese in style. Most of his works were paintings of natural subjects such as trees, fruit, fish and other animals done on glass or silk. But they also include portraits of members of the imperial family and court; altogether he is credited with at least 200 portraits.

Works 
After successful military campaigns in Central Asia, the Qianlong Emperor commissioned depictions of the battles. The work was carried out by four Jesuit artists, among them Attiret. The group produced 16 tableaux, which were engraved in France in 1774, six years after Attiret's death in Beijing.

See also
Jesuit China missions

References

External links

Catholic Encyclopedia
European Buildings with Chinese Characteristics
 Jean-Denis Attiret, 'A Particular Account of the Emperor of China's gardens near Pekin' , 1749.

1702 births
1768 deaths
People from Dole, Jura
French sinologists
18th-century French Jesuits
Jesuit missionaries in China
Catholic painters
18th-century French painters
French male painters
French expatriates in China
French Roman Catholic missionaries
18th-century French male artists